Bhatambra  is a village in the southern state of Karnataka, India. It is located in the Bhalki taluk of Bidar district in Karnataka.

Bhatambra Fort
Bhatambra is famous for the 12th century fort located in the village.  The fort is now also in bad conditions

Demographics
 India census, Bhatambra had a population of 7523 with 3867 males and 3656 females.

Transport 
Bhatambra is 6 km from Taluka headquarter Bhalki.  It is well connected by road to Bhalki.  Nearest major railway station is in Bhalki.

See also
 Aurad
 Basavakalyan
 Humnabad
 Bidar
 Districts of Karnataka

References

External links
 http://Bidar.nic.in/

Villages in Bidar district
Forts in Karnataka
Buildings and structures in Bidar district